The University of York Library is the library service for students and staff at the University of York, UK.

The current library physical premises comprise a series of three linked buildings to the north side of the University of York Heslington West campus. The buildings are also home to the Borthwick Institute for Archives.

Since the library's inception its collections have grown to encompass more than a million items, including books, journals, music scores, theses and dissertations, and digital media.

The Library is part of Library, Archives and Learning Services, which employs 168 staff, and which is in turn part of Student and Academic Services at the University of York.

History 
The University of York opened in 1963, with the main campus library opening in 1965. The building was designed by architects Robert Matthew, Johnson-Marshall and Partners, and build by Shepherd Construction. The original library building was named after John Bowes Morrell, a keen supporter for the establishment of a university in York, and a former Lord Mayor of the city.

Forty years on, the Raymond Burton Library was built alongside the Morrell in 2003. This building was designed by Leach Rhodes Walker architects as a home for a Humanities Research library and was designed to make a strong visual statement from its elevated position on the campus. The library is named after the Leeds business man and philanthropist Raymond Montague Burton who was a longtime supporter of the library.

A major £20 million refurbishment was completed in 2012, expanding the footprint of the library to include an additional building adjacent to the Morrell. This space was named after the first University Librarian appointed: Harry Fairhurst. Novelist Anthony Horowitz officially reopened the newly refurbished and expanded University library in February 2012.

The historic King's Manor Library is located in the centre of York in a Grade I listed building on Exhibition Square. The King's Manor building was originally constructed to house the abbots of St Mary's Abbey, York. It later became the site for the Yorkshire School for the Blind before it became the property of the City of York in 1958. This was prior to modernisation and extension for the University of York in 1963/4.

In 2021 students and the library's own Twitter account posted photographs of robins which had entered the library due to more windows being open during the COVID-19 pandemic, the library joked that they got their own library card.

In 2022 the library decided to permanently remove all fines for late return of books, in response the success of a similar measure introduced on a permanent basis during the COVID-19 pandemic.

Library buildings 
J.B. Morrell Library: houses collections to support learning, teaching and research across all subject areas. Named after John Bowes Morrell, an instigator in the formation of York University.

Harry Fairhurst Building: provides a mix of study spaces across three floors. Named after the university's first librarian Harry Fairhurst.

Raymond Burton Library: houses the Humanities Research reference collection. Named after a philanthropist supporter of the university.

Library@Piazza: a study space located in the Piazza Learning Centre on Campus East.

King's Manor Library: the collection focuses mainly on architecture, heritage management and stained glass. Part of the historic King's Manor building.

Collections 
The library provides collections to support the teaching, learning and research goals of the university, and to reflect the breadth of the university's user communities. The special collections include history of art, music, theological libraries, stained glass and Yorkshire.

Associated libraries 
The library of the National Railway Museum is called The Search Engine.

The York Minster Library is located in Deans Park to the north of York Minster.

The collections from both libraries are searchable through the University of York library online catalogue, branded as YorSearch.

Partnerships 
The library is a member of several organizations including:

 Research Libraries UK
 SCONUL

References

Further reading

External links 
University of York Library web site
University of York library catalogue

University of York
Libraries in North Yorkshire
York
York